"Juste un instant (Just a Moment)" is a song performed by French singer M. Pokora. It serves as the lead single from Pokora's fifth studio album "À la poursuite du bonheur".  It was released on January 30, 2012. The song has charted on the French Singles Chart and on the Belgian Singles Chart.

Music video 
The video was released on YouTube on January 31, 2012.
The video tells the story of a girl he wants to win anyway, he walks around the city, calls her attention, monitores and chases her everywhere.

Chart performance 
"Juste un instant" debuted on the French Singles Chart at number 33 and peaked at number 18.

Charts

References

2012 singles
M. Pokora songs
Songs written by Matthieu Mendès
Songs written by M. Pokora
2012 songs
EMI Records singles